Methane reservoirs on Earth are mainly found in
Oil and gas reservoirs as natural gas
Coalbeds
the seabed and the Arctic and other permafrost regions as methane clathrate
the atmosphere
decaying organic material
with the exact distribution so far determined by the methane cycle/carbon cycle.

Methane as the main ingredient of natural gas and as an extractable fossil fuel-energy resource has limited if significant reserves. Russia, Iran, and Qatar are topping the list with together , nearly half the world's proven reserves. Methane from gas fields is an important factor in the world energy production and consumption. Methane clathrate is a potential future energy source, if it doesn't escape to the atmosphere before extraction because of global warming. In the atmosphere, it is not only unusable, but also a potent greenhouse gas, further accelerating the current climate change. But even conventional reservoirs are leaking methane (together with other gases like carbon dioxide) especially downstream the processing line.

References

See also
Natural gas storage
Natural-gas condensate

Natural gas
Methane